Aleksandras Stulginskis  (26 February 1885 – 22 September 1969) was the second President of Lithuania (1920–1926). Stulginskis was also acting President of Lithuania for a few hours later in 1926, following a military coup that was led by his predecessor, President Antanas Smetona, and which had brought down Stulginskis's successor, Kazys Grinius. The coup returned Smetona to office after Stulginskis's brief formal assumption of the Presidency.

He began his theological studies in Kaunas and continued in Innsbruck, Austria. However, he decided not to become a priest and moved to the Institute of Agricultural Sciences in University of Halle. He graduated in 1913 and returned to Lithuania. There he started to work as a farmer. He published many articles on agronomy in Lithuanian press. In 1918 he started to publish  journals Ūkininkas ("Farmer") and Ūkininko kalendorius ("Farmer's Calendar").

During World War I he moved to Vilnius. He was one of the founders of the Lithuanian Christian Democratic Party and the head of its Central Committee in 1917. He signed the memorandum for the president Woodrow Wilson, addressing the question of the recognition of the Lithuanian statehood by the United States. Contrary to Smetona's views, Stulginskis was oriented towards the Entente. He was one of co-organizers of the Vilnius Conference. After, he was elected to the Council of Lithuania.

On 16 February 1918 he signed the Act of Independence of Lithuania. He was an advocate of the democratic republic as the form of the Lithuanian state. Thus, he strongly opposed the idea of monarchy (actually, Mindaugas II was the King of Lithuania from 11 July to 2 November 1918). In independent Lithuania Stulginskis  was in charge of organizing the national army to defend the country against the aggressions of Bolsheviks and Poles.

Many times served as a minister, May 1920 – 1922 he was Speaker of the Constituent Assembly of Lithuania and thus acting president of the republic. 1922-1926 he was the second President of Lithuania. Stulginskis was Speaker of the Seimas 1926-1927.

He withdrew from politics in 1927, and worked on his farm. In 1941 Stulginskis and his wife were arrested by the Soviet NKVD and deported to a gulag in the Krasnoyarsk region, while his wife was deported to the Komi area. After World War II in 1952 he was officially sentenced by the Soviet authorities to 25 years in prison for his anti-socialist and clerical policies in pre-war Lithuania.

Released after Joseph Stalin's death in 1956, he was allowed to emigrate, yet he refused and returned to Lithuanian SSR. Stulginskis settled in Kaunas, where he died on 22 September 1969, aged 84, the last of the Signatories of the Act of Independence of Lithuania.

See also 
 List of presidents of Lithuania

References

 Stulginskis, Aleksandras. Encyclopedia Lituanica V: 314-316. (1970–1978). Ed. Simas Sužiedėlis. Boston, Massachusetts: Juozas Kapočius. LCCN 74-114275.
 President of Lithuania: Prisoner of the Gulag a Biography of Aleksandras Stulginskis by Afonsas Eidintas Genocide and Research Center of Lithuania  .

External links 

 Aleksandras Stulginskis information
 Additional information
 STULGINSKIS Aleksandras (1885–1969)

1885 births
1969 deaths
People from Šilalė District Municipality
People from Rossiyensky Uyezd
Lithuanian Roman Catholics
Lithuanian Christian Democratic Party politicians
Presidents of Lithuania
Members of the Council of Lithuania
Ministers of Agriculture of Lithuania
Ministers of Foreign Affairs of Lithuania
Ministers of Internal Affairs of Lithuania
Speakers of the Seimas
Lithuanian anti-communists
Lithuanian independence activists
Prisoners and detainees of the Soviet Union
Inmates of Vladimir Central Prison